December is a Malayalam language film. It was released in 1988.

References

1988 films
1980s Malayalam-language films